Block II Area is one of the 12 operational areas of BCCL located in Dhanbad Sadar subdivision of Dhanbad district in the state of Jharkhand, India.

History
The Block II Area came into existence in 1983-84 with the reorganisation of collieries in the region and opening of the World Bank funded Block II Project.

Geography

Location
The Block II Area is located 40 km from Dhanbad Junction railway station and 10 km from Netaji Subhas Chandra Bose Gomoh railway station.

The map alongside shows some of the collieries in the Area. However, as the collieries do not have individual pages, there are no links in the full screen map.

Mining activity
Block II colliery having Block II open cast project (departmental) plus crusher patch II A and III (with hired equipment).
Jamunia colliery having Jamunia OCP (departmental) plus Kali Mandir patch II (with hired equipment).

Mining support
Block II Area has the following workshop facilities:
Block II OCP dumper workshop
Jamunia OCP dumper workshop
Regional repair workshop

Mining plan

An overview of the proposed mining activity plan in Cluster II, a group of 5 mines in the Block II and Barora Areas (showing only Block II here), as of 2012, is as follows:

1.Block II colliery has an operating open cast mine and a proposed underground mine. The open cast mine has a normative production capacity of 4 million tonnes per year and a peak production capacity of 5.2 million tonnes per year. It had an expected life of over 26 years. The underground mine has a normative production capacity of 0.45 million tonnes per year and a peak production capacity of 0.585 million tonnes per year. It had an expected life of over 30 years.

2. Jamunia colliery has an operating open cast mine. The open cast mine has a normative production capacity of 1.2 million tonnes per year and a peak production capacity of 1.56 million tonnes per year. It had an expected life of over 6 years.

Mine fire
Block II OCP mine up to X seam, covering approximately 14.5 hectares is affected by mining fire. Efforts are being made to dig out the fiery coal.

References

Coal mining operational areas in Jharkhand